Acoustic Christmas Carols: Cowboy Christmas II is the twenty-second album by American singer-songwriter Michael Martin Murphey and his second album of Christmas music. Recorded at St. James Episcopal Church in Taos, New Mexico, the church Murphey attended at the time, the album consists of carols from the nineteenth century or earlier played on acoustic instruments, among them "Silent Night" and "Joy to the World". Murphey's arrangements feature his own finger-picked guitar, accompanied by John McEuen on banjo or mandolin, or Paul Sadler on hammer dulcimer. Murphey's sons, Ryan and Brennan, play blues guitar licks on "Go Tell It on the Mountain", and his daughter, Laura, sings a duet with her father on "Silent Night". This is a "spare and reverent Christmas album, appropriate for a rustic celebration in a Western church."

Track listing
 "Home Sweet Home" (Bishop, Paine) – 2:21
 "O Little Town of Bethlehem" (Brooks, Redner) – 4:29
 "The First Noël" (Sandys) – 4:41
 "In the Bleak Midwinter" (Holst, Rossetti) – 3:39
 "Twas in the Moon of Wintertime (Huron Carole)" (Middleton, Traditional) – 2:29
 "Away in a Manger" (Murray, Traditional) – 2:40
 "Joy to the World" (Mason, Watts) – 2:33
 "It Came Upon a Midnight Clear" (Sears, Willis) – 2:48
 "We Three Kings" (Hopkins) – 4:05
 "Go Tell It on the Mountain" (Traditional) – 3:35
 "Silent Night" (Gruber, Mohr) – 3:37
 "What Child Is This?" (Dix, Traditional) – 4:34
 "I Heard the Bells on Christmas Day" (Longfellow) – 2:40
 "Home Sweet Home" (reprise) (Bishop, Paine) – 1:26

Credits
Music
 Michael Martin Murphey – vocals, guitar, tambourine, harmony vocals, arranger, producer, liner notes
 John McEuen – banjo, Indian drums, mandolin, tambourine, guitar
 Joey Miskulin – accordion, producer
 Ryan Murphey – guitar
 Paul Sadler – hammer dulcimer

Production
 Craig A. Wolf – engineer
 Dan Rudin – engineer, mixing
 Denny Purcell – mastering
 John Work – adaptation
 John F. Young – translation

References

External links
 Michael Martin Murphey's Official Website

1999 Christmas albums
Christmas albums by American artists
Michael Martin Murphey albums
Country Christmas albums
Sequel albums